"Joy" is a song by English electronic musician Mark Ryder, released as a single in 2001. It contains samples from Soft Cell's version of "Tainted Love", and features vocals from Special MC and Heidi Rydquist. The song reached the UK top 40, peaking at No. 34 on the UK Singles Chart, and also reached No. 1 on the UK Dance Singles Chart in early 2001.

In November 2016, UK duo Gorgon City compiled a list of their top UK garage songs for Billboard, with "Joy" at #28.

Track listing
UK 12"
A1. "Joy" (Original Version)
A2. "Joy" (Rapapella)
B1. "Joy" (Ruff Ryder Garage Remix)
B2. "Joy" (Waveform Breakbeat Remix)

Charts

References

2000 songs
2001 singles
UK garage songs
Relentless Records singles
Songs written by Ed Cobb